In mathematics, a real-valued function is called convex if the line segment between any two points on the graph of the function lies above the graph between the two points. Equivalently, a function is convex if its epigraph (the set of points on or above the graph of the function) is a convex set. A twice-differentiable function of a single variable is convex if and only if its second derivative is nonnegative on its entire domain. Well-known examples of convex functions of a single variable include the quadratic function  and the exponential function .   In simple terms, a convex function refers to a function whose graph is shaped like a cup , while a concave function's graph is shaped like a cap .

Convex functions play an important role in many areas of mathematics. They are especially important in the study of optimization problems where they are distinguished by a number of convenient properties. For instance, a strictly convex function on an open set has no more than one minimum. Even in infinite-dimensional spaces, under suitable additional hypotheses, convex functions continue to satisfy such properties and as a result, they are the most well-understood functionals in the calculus of variations. In probability theory, a convex function applied to the expected value of a random variable is always bounded above by the expected value of the convex function of the random variable.  This result, known as Jensen's inequality, can be used to deduce inequalities such as the arithmetic–geometric mean inequality and Hölder's inequality.

Definition

Let  be a convex subset of a real vector space and let  be a function.

Then  is called  if and only if any of the following equivalent conditions hold:

For all  and all :

For all  and all  such that :

The second statement characterizing convex functions that are valued in the real line  is also the statement used to define  that are valued in the extended real number line  where such a function  is allowed to take  as a value.

Explicitly, the map  is called  if and only if for all real  and all  such that :

A strictly convex function  is a function that the straight line between any pair of points on the curve  is above the curve  except for the intersection points between the straight line and the curve.

The function  is said to be  (resp. ) if  ( multiplied by −1) is convex (resp. strictly convex).

Alternative naming
The term convex is often referred to as convex down or concave upward, and the term concave is often referred as concave down or convex upward. If the term "convex" is used without an "up" or "down" keyword,  then it refers strictly to a cup shaped graph .  As an example, Jensen's inequality refers to an inequality involving a convex or convex-(up), function.

Properties 

Many properties of convex functions have the same simple formulation for functions of many variables as for functions of one variable. See below the properties for the case of many variables, as some of them are not listed for functions of one variable.

Functions of one variable 

This characterization of convexity is quite useful to prove the following results.
 A convex function  of one real variable defined on some open interval  is continuous on   admits left and right derivatives, and these are monotonically non-decreasing.
 A differentiable function of one variable is convex on an interval if and only if its derivative is monotonically non-decreasing on that interval. If a function is differentiable and convex then it is also continuously differentiable (due to Darboux's theorem).
 A twice differentiable function of one variable is convex on an interval if and only if its second derivative is non-negative there; this gives a practical test for convexity. Visually, a twice differentiable convex function "curves up", without any bends the other way (inflection points). If its second derivative is positive at all points then the function is strictly convex, but the converse does not hold.

 A function is midpoint convex on an interval  if for all   This condition is only slightly weaker than convexity. For example, a real-valued Lebesgue measurable function that is midpoint-convex is convex: this is a theorem of Sierpinski. In particular, a continuous function that is midpoint convex will be convex.

Functions of several variables 

 A function  valued in the extended real numbers  is convex if and only if its epigraph  is a convex set.
 A differentiable function  defined on a convex domain is convex if and only if  holds for all  in the domain.
 A twice differentiable function of several variables is convex on a convex set if and only if its Hessian matrix of second partial derivatives is positive semidefinite on the interior of the convex set.
 Consequently, the set of global minimisers of a convex function  is a convex set:  - convex.
 Any local minimum of a convex function is also a global minimum.  A  convex function will have at most one global minimum.
 Jensen's inequality applies to every convex function . If  is a random variable taking values in the domain of  then  where  denotes the mathematical expectation. Indeed, convex functions are exactly those that satisfies the hypothesis of Jensen's inequality. 

Operations that preserve convexity

  is concave if and only if  is convex.
 If  is any real number then  is convex if and only if  is convex.
 Nonnegative weighted sums:
this property extends to infinite sums, integrals and expected values as well (provided that they exist).
 Elementwise maximum: let  be a collection of convex functions. Then  is convex. Important special cases:
If  are convex functions then so is 
Danskin's theorem: If  is convex in  then  is convex in  even if  is not a convex set.
 Composition:
For example, if  is convex, then so is  because  is convex and monotonically increasing.
 Minimization: If  is convex in  then  is convex in  provided that  is a convex set and that 
 If  is convex, then its perspective  with domain  is convex.
 Let  be a vector space.  is convex and satisfies  if and only if  for any  and any non-negative real numbers  that satisfy

Strongly convex functions

The concept of strong convexity extends and parametrizes the notion of strict convexity. A strongly convex function is also strictly convex, but not vice versa.

A differentiable function  is called strongly convex with parameter  if the following inequality holds for all points  in its domain:

or, more generally,

Some authors, such as  refer to functions satisfying this inequality as elliptic functions.

An equivalent condition is the following:

It is not necessary for a function to be differentiable in order to be strongly convex. A third definition for a strongly convex function, with parameter  is that, for all  in the domain and 

This is equivalent to requiring that the minimum eigenvalue of  be at least  for all  If the domain is just the real line, then  is just the second derivative  so the condition becomes . If  then this means the Hessian is positive semidefinite (or if the domain is the real line, it means that ), which implies the function is convex, and perhaps strictly convex, but not strongly convex.

Assuming still that the function is twice continuously differentiable, one can show that the lower bound of  implies that it is strongly convex. Using Taylor's Theorem there exists

such that

Then

by the assumption about the eigenvalues, and hence we recover the second strong convexity equation above.

A function  is strongly convex with parameter m if and only if the function

is convex.

The distinction between convex, strictly convex, and strongly convex can be subtle at first glance. If  is twice continuously differentiable and the domain is the real line, then we can characterize it as follows:
 convex if and only if  for all 
 strictly convex if  for all  (note: this is sufficient, but not necessary).
 strongly convex if and only if  for all 

For example, let  be strictly convex, and suppose there is a sequence of points  such that . Even though , the function is not strongly convex because  will become arbitrarily small.

A twice continuously differentiable function  on a compact domain  that satisfies  for all  is strongly convex. The proof of this statement follows from the extreme value theorem, which states that a continuous function on a compact set has a maximum and minimum.

Strongly convex functions are in general easier to work with than convex or strictly convex functions, since they are a smaller class. Like strictly convex functions, strongly convex functions have unique minima on compact sets.

Uniformly convex functions

A uniformly convex function, with modulus , is a function  that, for all  in the domain and  satisfies

where  is a function that is non-negative and vanishes only at 0. This is a generalization of the concept of strongly convex function; by taking  we recover the definition of strong convexity.

It is worth noting that some authors require the modulus  to be an increasing function, but this condition is not required by all authors.

Examples

Functions of one variable
 The function  has , so  is a convex function.  It is also strongly convex (and hence strictly convex too), with strong convexity constant 2.
 The function  has , so  is a convex function.  It is strictly convex, even though the second derivative is not strictly positive at all points.  It is not strongly convex.
 The absolute value function  is convex (as reflected in the triangle inequality), even though it does not have a derivative at the point   It is not strictly convex.
 The exponential function  is convex.  It is also strictly convex, since , but it is not strongly convex since the second derivative can be arbitrarily close to zero.  More generally, the function  is logarithmically convex if  is a convex function.  The term "superconvex" is sometimes used instead.
 The function  has second derivative ; thus it is convex on the set where  and concave on the set where 
 The function  has  which is greater than 0 if  so  is convex on the interval . It is concave on the interval .

Functions of n variables
 LogSumExp function, also called softmax function, is a convex function. 
The function  on the domain of positive-definite matrices is convex.
 Every real-valued linear transformation is convex but not strictly convex, since if  is linear, then . This statement also holds if we replace "convex" by "concave".
 Every real-valued affine function, that is, each function of the form  is simultaneously convex and concave.
 Every norm is a convex function, by the triangle inequality and positive homogeneity.
 The spectral radius of a nonnegative matrix is a convex function of its diagonal elements.

See also

 Concave function
 Convex analysis
 Convex conjugate
 Convex curve
 Convex optimization
 Geodesic convexity
 Hahn–Banach theorem
 Hermite–Hadamard inequality
 Invex function
 Jensen's inequality
 K-convex function
 Kachurovskii's theorem, which relates convexity to monotonicity of the derivative
 Karamata's inequality
 Logarithmically convex function
 Pseudoconvex function
 Quasiconvex function
 Subderivative of a convex function

Notes

References
 
 Borwein, Jonathan, and Lewis, Adrian. (2000). Convex Analysis and Nonlinear Optimization. Springer.
 
 Hiriart-Urruty, Jean-Baptiste, and Lemaréchal, Claude. (2004). Fundamentals of Convex analysis. Berlin: Springer.

External links
 
 

Convex analysis
Generalized convexity
Types of functions